Brie Howard-Darling (also known and credited as Brie Darling, Brie Howard, Brie Brandt, and Brie Berry) is an American drummer, singer, percussionist, songwriter, artist, cake designer, and actress of Filipino and European descent. She has recorded with such recording artists as Carole King, Ringo Starr, ELO, Keith Moon, The Temptations, Jimmy Buffett, Melissa Manchester, Janiva Magness, and Glen Campbell.  She has toured extensively with Martin Mull, Kiki Dee, Jack Wagner, Bruce Willis, Robert Palmer, Carole King, Jimmy Buffett, Robbie Nevil, and Duran Duran.  She has been a band member of Fanny, American Girls, Boxing Gandhis, Fanny Walked The Earth, and Cherie Currie & Brie Darling.

Early life
Howard-Darling was born (August 9, 1949) in Stockton, California and raised in Folsom, California, a suburb of Sacramento, California to parents Elmo Robert Berry and Angeles Calamaya. Darling is a sixth generation Californian.

She began performing professionally at fourteen years old with the band, The Kee-Notes, and became a member of the Sacramento Musician's Union in 1964.  In 1965 the band recorded three songs for Esar Records, making Darling one of the first female rock drummers to record rock music.  She credits her younger and older brothers as her greatest early influences, as they were both musicians, and there was a drum kit in their living room where she could practice.  In 1966, she joined the all-female Sacramento band The Svelts, which would later evolve into Fanny, becoming the first all-woman band to be signed to a major record label to record a full album.

In 1967, Howard-Darling married Mike Brandt. She gave birth to her daughter Brandi Brandt in 1968.

Career

Fanny
Howard-Darling  joined former band members in Los Angeles in 1970, forming a short-lived lineup of the all-female band Fanny as the lead singer.  A decision was made to change the number of band members from five members to four creating more of a Fab Four image.  She left the band and pursued other musical ventures.

Howard-Darling rejoined Fanny in 1974, recording Rock and Roll Survivors released on Casablanca Records.  The first single, "I've Had It" reached #79 on the Billboard Hot 100. Their second single, Butter Boy, spent 11 weeks on the Billboard Hot 100 peaking at #29 on April 5, 1975.  Fanny was the first all-woman rock band to release an album on a major label. After a U.S. tour promoting the album, Darling (Brie Howard) left the band.

David Bowie said of Fanny in 1999 to Rolling Stone:

They were one of the finest ... rock bands of their time. They were extraordinary: They wrote everything ... they were just colossal and wonderful, and nobody's ever mentioned them. They're as important as anybody else who's ever been, ever; it just wasn't their time.

In 2018, original band members Jean Millington (bass), June Millington (lead guitar), and Howard-Darling reunited as Fanny Walked the Earth, releasing an eponymous album, their first recording together in more than 40 years. It features several female musicians who have credited Fanny with helping open the door for them decades ago, among them the Runaways’ Cherie Currie, the Go-Go's Kathy Valentine, the Bangles’ Susanna Hoffs, Vicki and Debbi Peterson, veteran rock singer and musician Genya Ravan and former Fanny member Patti Quatro, the sister of Suzi Quatro.

American Girls
American Girls (band) were an American all-female band based in California, United States. The band consisted of Howard-Darling (vocals, drums, percussion), Hilary Shepard (vocals, percussion), DB Tressler (guitar), Miiko Watanabe (bass, backing vocals) and Teresa James (keyboards, backing vocals).  Original members included Louise Goffin (rhythm guitar, lead and backing vocals) and Daryl Hannah (keyboards).

American Girls released one album, in 1986 titled American Girls. The video for their single "American Girl" received some airplay on MTV.
Their song "Androgynous" appeared in the 1986 film Tough Guys and the song "American Girl" appeared on the soundtrack for Out of Bounds.  They also opened for The Lords of the New Church on 1986 tour dates.

Miles Copeland III (brother of the Police's Stewart Copeland) was the band's manager.

Touring drummer, percussionist and vocalist
Aside from Howard-Darling's own music projects and bands, she has toured extensively with other successful recording artists, most notably with Carole King, Jimmy Buffett and Robert Palmer. Starting in 1990, she toured with King as a percussionist and vocalist for five years in the U.S. and internationally. Darling performed with Jimmy Buffett on five tours over a span of five years and with Robert Palmer for two U.S. tours and one international tour.

Boxing Gandhis
Howard-Darling and her husband, Dave Darling are the founders of Boxing Gandhis which was signed to the record label, Mesa Blue Moon in 1993. The band has recorded three albums. They climbed the charts with a #5 hit on the Billboard Triple A (Adult Album Alternative) charts with the song, If You Love Me (Why Am I Dyin') off their debut album after touring the US as opening act for the Dave Matthews Band and Big Head Todd and the Monsters. The song's music video also garnered a Billboard Music Award for "Video of the Year" which was directed by Brian Lockwood (director). If You Love Me (Why Am I Dyin') was featured in Episode 3 of the 2011 season of the HBO Original Series True Blood.

Boxing Gandhis (1994, Mesa Records)
Howard (1996, Atlantic Records)
Culture War (2019, Blue Elan Records)

Fanny Walked The Earth
In 2016, Howard-Darling joined a live performance by her former Fanny bandmates June and Jean Millington. This inspired the formation of a new band called Fanny Walked the Earth. An album of all-new songs with the same title was released in March 2018. The album marks the first time June, Jean, and Brie all recorded at the same time in over 40 years.

Cherie Currie and Brie Darling
Currie and Howard-Darling (credited as Brie Darling) recorded The Motivator, a full-length album that was released on August 2, 2019 on Blue Elan Records.

Filmography

Acting
 1982 Android as Maggie
 1986 Simon & Simon as Hooker
 1987 The Return of Bruno as The Singers
 1987 Alexander O'Neal: Criticize as Drummer
 1988 Tapeheads as Flygirl 
 1989 The Runnin' Kind as "Thunder"
 1990 General Hospital as Congas
 1994 Somebody to Love as Band Member

Music videos and television appearances
Howard-Darling has performed with a variety of recording artists on television shows such as American Bandstand, Soul Train, The David Letterman Show, The Tonight Show, Don Kirshner's Rock Concert, The Midnight Special, The Joan Rivers Show, and The Mike Douglas Show.

 1986 Robbie Nevil - "C'est la Vie" - Music Video - Percussion and Vocals - MTV Music Video Award - Best Cinematography
 1986 Robbie Nevil - "Wot's It To Ya" - Music Video - Percussion and Vocals
 1986 Robbie Nevil - "Dominoes" - Music Video - Percussion and Vocals
 1987 Deniece Williams - "Never Say Never"  - Music Video - Percussion and Vocals 
 1987 Alexander O'Neal - "Criticize" - Music Video - Percussion and Vocals
 1990 A'me Lorain - "Whole Wide World" - Music Video - Percussion 
 1990 Natalie Cole - "Wild Women Do" - Music Video - Percussion and Vocals 
 1990 Carole King - In Concert Televised Concert - Percussion and Vocals
 1991 Robbie Nevil - "Just Like You" - Music Video - Percussion and Vocals
 1993 Boxing Gandhis - "If You Love Me (Why Am I Dyin')" - Music Video - Percussion and Vocals - VH1  Music Award
 1993 Culture Clash TV Series - Band Member
 2000 Don't Forget Your Toothbrush - Band Member
 2017 Women of Rock Oral History Project at the Sophia Smith Collection, Smith College

Nightline - Michael Jackson Thriller album
"Nightline", a song co-written by Howard-Darling, Glen Ballard and Davey Faragher, was recorded by Michael Jackson and slated to be released on Michael Jackson's Thriller album in 1983 but was pulled before the release. The song had been recently recorded and released by Randy Crawford, The Pointer Sisters, and Ellen Foley.

Brie Darling Cakes
Howard-Darling began creating artistic cakes in 2010. Darling invented the process of baking leopard print cakes.

Cake Wars
In 2016 she and her granddaughter, Storm Sixx, won 1st place and $10,000 as contestants in Season 2 of the Food Network's Cake Wars where four bakers face off to have their cakes featured in a special event.

Discography

References

External links

Brie Howard discography at Discogs

Living people
American women drummers
American funk singers
American rock drummers
1949 births
20th-century American drummers
20th-century American women musicians
Fanny (band) members
American Girls (band) members
21st-century American drummers
21st-century American women musicians